Diadegma aegyptiacum is a wasp first described by Horstmann in 1993.  No subspecies are listed.

References

aegyptiacum
Insects described in 1993